Life Study  is a cross-disciplinary research study that will look at the health and wellbeing of thousands of children across the UK. It will collect a large amount of information on the health, growth and life factors of a new generation of children born in the UK.  
This study will create a large storehouse of social, medical and environmental information and linked routine health data for use by UK academics and policy communities. The information in this storehouse resource will help answer questions regarding early life development of health and disease, and physical, psychological and social well-being.

It is funded by the UK Department for Business, Innovation and Skills (BIS), Economic and Social Research Council (ESRC) and Medical Research Council (MRC) academics from the Institute of Child Health's Paediatric Epidemiology Unit at University College London (UCL) are leading the study, with Professor Carol Dezateux the Director of the project.

Aims and objectives

The study aims to understand how biological and environmental factors interact with a baby's early life experiences and the outcomes this has later in life. The study will cover five main research themes:

 Inequalities, diversity (including ethnic) and social changes in this new generation of UK children
 Early life factors of school readiness and later educational performance
 Development beginnings of health and illness in childhood
 Social, emotional and mental development: the interaction between the child and parent
 Neighbourhoods and the surrounding environment: effects on child and family

Comparison with past UK cohort studies
This will be the fifth UK birth cohort study (beginning in 1946) which have followed the lives of children from birth to adult life. As was the case with these earlier studies, Life Study will provide a wide range of new information into the health, growth and life factors of this new generation of UK children.

Life study update
The Economic and Social Research Council (ESRC) and the Medical Research Council (MRC) discontinued Research Councils’ funding for Life Study in early 2016 due to the challenges encountered in recruiting participants.

References

Children's health
Department for Business, Innovation and Skills